Hasle-Løren Idrettslag is a Norwegian sports club from the neighborhoods Hasle and Løren in Oslo. It was founded in 1911, and has sections for association football, bandy, ice hockey, skiing, and cycling.

Ice hockey
Some of its greatest success was achieved by the ice hockey team. The team plays its home games in Lørenhallen, which holds 1,000 spectators. As of 2007, it is in the 1. divisjon - the second highest Norwegian ice hockey competition.

The club has a rich history in Norwegian Ice Hockey. It was the Norway champion in 1972, 1974, 1976. It won the 1. divisjon league in the 1971/72, 1972/73 and 1974/75 seasons.

Football

The men's football team won promotion to the Norwegian Second Division, the third highest tier, in 2010 after winning the league and playoffs. In the 2011 Norwegian Second Division campaign, Hasle-Løren was relegated. A famous former coach is Egil Olsen.

From the 2000 season it formed a cooperation with neighboring clubs Årvoll IL and Linderud IL to field an umbrella team named Bjerkealliansen on junior level (age 19 and below). In 2008 Hasle-Løren broke out of the alliance.

References

External links
 

Sports clubs established in 1911
Association football clubs established in 1911
Bandy clubs established in 1911
1911 establishments in Norway
Ice hockey teams in Norway
Football clubs in Oslo
Sport in Oslo
Defunct bandy clubs in Norway